Inappropriate Comedy (stylized as inAPPropriate Comedy) is a 2013 American satirical sketch comedy film directed by Vince Offer. It stars Ari Shaffir (who also co-wrote), Rob Schneider, Michelle Rodriguez, Adrien Brody and Lindsay Lohan, and was released on March 22, 2013.

The film was originally envisioned as a sequel to Offer's previous anthology, The Underground Comedy Movie, and called Underground Comedy 2010. Trailers for Underground Comedy 2010 were released to TV and the internet before the film being billed as Inappropriate Comedy. It is also a partial remake of Offer's previous film, recycling the sketches "Flirty Harry" and "Sushi Mama". The film was a critical and commercial failure, with some critics comparing it to the (itself critically panned) Movie 43.

Plot
The framing device has Vince Offer pressing buttons on his tablet computer that open offensive applications.

Psychology World
A psychologist (Rob Schneider) has a session with a sex-obsessed young woman (Noelle Kenney) who wants to change. She shows him the pills that "make her wild". He takes them and passes out on the floor.

Flirty Harry
Flirty Harry (Adrien Brody) is a cop who, with his repertoire of frequently homoerotic double entendres, patrols the streets of San Francisco.

Blackass
A Jackass spoof, where Vondell (Da'Vone McDonald), Murphay (Calvin Sykes), Swade (Thai Edwards), Darnell (Chalant Phifer), and Acquon (Ashton Jordaan Ruiz) are five African American guys who go about their days causing trouble.

The Porno Review
J.D. (Rob Schneider), Harriet (Michelle Rodriguez), and Bob (Jonathan Spencer) (who spends most of the time masturbating) host an At the Movies-style film review series that showcases pornographic films, including the dubbed Asian film "Sushi Mama" and a homosexual parody of Swan Lake known as Sperm Lake.

Things You'll Never See
A beautiful young woman (Kiersten Hall) dating an old poor man (Anthony Russell).

Above the Grate
Lindsay Lohan stands on an air vent much like Marilyn Monroe's famous scene from The Seven Year Itch while a man (Vince Offer) watches her from underneath.

The Amazing Racist
A spoof of The Amazing Race. Ari Shaffir and his cameraman go around the city showcasing extremely racist and offensive stereotypes against Asians, African Americans, Arabs, Hispanics and Jews. It is heavily implied that all of Shaffir's doings were not rehearsed and done to random people on the street.

Cast

Psychology World
 Rob Schneider as Psychologist
 Noelle Kenney as Patient

Flirty Harry
 Adrien Brody as Flirty Harry
 Jonathan Spencer as Lt. O'Flanagan
 Rick Chambers as Captain
 Andrea Lwin as Beautician

Blackass
 Da'Vone McDonald as Vondell
 Calvin Sykes as Murphay
 Thai Edwards as Swade
 Chalant Phifer as Darnell
 Ashton Jordaan Ruiz as Acquon
 Jessie Usher as Jamal
 Caroline Rich as Cindi

The Porno Review
 Rob Schneider as J.D.
 Michelle Rodriguez as Harriet
 Jonathan Spencer as Bob
 Isaac Cheung as Sushi Papa
 Jia Perlich as Sushi Mama
 Christopher Kosek as Hillbilly

Things You'll Never See
 Kiersten Hall as Beautiful girl
 Anthony Russell as Old man

Above the Grate
 Lindsay Lohan as herself
 Kenneth and Sasha Mayer as Kissing couple

Under the Grate
 Theo Von as Mountain climber
 Vince Offer as Peeping Tom

The Amazing Racist
 Ari Shaffir as The Amazing Racist
 Dante as The Racist Assistant

Production
Lohan's scenes were shot in 2010 for Underground Comedy 2010, a production that would have mixed newly filmed sketches with sketches from the original 1997 production of The Underground Comedy Movie. The alcohol-detecting ankle monitor she was ordered to wear after she failed to show up for a court hearing is clearly visible as she stands on the street grate.

A trailer for Underground Comedy 2010 was released in August of that year. The project was eventually expanded to a fully new feature film with the production of additional new sketches. Ari Shaffir's segment mixed footage with unknowing collaborators and staged action, mostly using the same people brought back "to do a little extra so we can build a story or get me some comeuppance".

The film was directed by Vince Offer, who also directed The Underground Comedy Movie and, between the two films, became better known for his infomercial sales pitches (his best known product being the ShamWow absorbent towel).

Reception

InAPPropriate Comedy was called “worse than Movie 43” by The Hollywood Reporter. Rotten Tomatoes gives the film a score of 0%, based on 5 reviews. At Metacritic, it holds a score of 1 out of 100, based on 5 reviews, meaning “overwhelming dislike”. It is tied with 10 Rules for Sleeping Around, Chaos, Bio-Dome, Not Cool, The Singing Forest, The Garbage Pail Kids Movie, Death of a Nation, Hardbodies, and United Passions as the worst reviewed film on the site.

Lohan was nominated for a Golden Raspberry Award for Worst Supporting Actress for her performance in the film (also for Scary Movie 5), but lost to Kim Kardashian for Temptation: Confessions of a Marriage Counselor.

Box office
The film earned $172,000 from 275 theaters, for a location average of $625 in its opening weekend.

References

External links

 
 
 
 

2013 films
2013 comedy films
American comedy films
American independent films
American satirical films
American anthology films
Films shot in Los Angeles
2013 independent films
Sketch comedy films
2010s English-language films
2010s American films